A universal receiver is generally a radio receiver that is able to work with different standard transmitters.

In case of home automations, this identify a radio receiver that works with almost any remote control in the market normally, used to open gates, garage doors, traffic barriers, entrance doors, etcetera. 
In other words, the universal receiver is able to recognize the code transmitted by other standard and not-standard remote controls, and is suitable to replace existing receiver permitting to add new and different remote controls on the automation system.

Background

The first electric garage door opener was created in 1921 by C.G. Johnson.  He realized there was a problem with garage doors being in the way when needed to be opened and found a solution that would change the way Americans lift garage doors forever. He called it the "upward lifting garage door." At the time that this invention was made many people were exchanging horses and buggies were begging for a more efficient way to do it. Therefore, C.G. Johnson created the "upward lifting garage door" that lifted up and completely out of the way and would take up no space since it was going up instead of side to side.

Use

With the use of Universal Receivers it can be used in everyday life by helping the average homeowner lift garage doors. This is used to open/close or turn on/off devices or large pieces of machinery. As for large companies this is also a necessity when importing or exporting goods. It would take a lot of labor to manually lift huge garage doors and open heavy gates. Another example are electric gate openers. This can be used for electric gate openers in a neighborhood complex for security. Instead of having someone manually drive to the front of their neighborhood when a guest arrives a code may be given so that every time the code is inputted the gate doors will open automatically.

References

External links
Radio Codes
Ford Radio Codes
Ford Radio Codes
Radio Codes

Remote control